José Abílio Silva de Santana (born 13 February 1965, Salvador) popularly known as pastor Abílio Santana is a Brazilian preacher and politician of the Humanist Solidarity Party PHS political party. He was elected to the Brazilian chamber of Federal Deputies in 2018.

Life and career 
De Santana was born in Salvador in 1965. He is one of the influential preachers in the largest Pentecostal Protestant missionary congress in Brazil, the Gideões Missionários da Última Hora based in Camboriú. In 2018, he was involved in a severe auto crash in Northern Bahia and was rushed to a hospital in Casa Nova Municipality and later transferred Juazeiro. He was elected a Federal Deputy in the 2018 election of the federal deputies with total votes of 50,345 or (0.73%) cast for his party.

References 

Living people
1965 births
Brazilian politicians
Brazilian Pentecostal pastors
Brazilian Protestant missionaries
Humanist Party of Solidarity politicians
Members of the Chamber of Deputies (Brazil) from Bahia